Chen Li and Li Fang were the defending champions, but lost in the quarterfinals to tournament winners Claudia Porwik and Linda Wild.

Porwik and Wild won the title by defeating Stephanie Rottier and Wang Shi-ting 6–1, 6–0 in the final.

Seeds

Draw

Draw

References

External links
 Official results archive (ITF)
 Official results archive (WTA)

1995 WTA Tour